The K. J. Somaiya Institute of Management Studies and Research (KJ SIMSR) now known as K.J. Somaiya Institute of Management (KJSIM) is an autonomous business school located in Somaiya Vidyavihar, Mumbai. It was established in 1981 as a part of the K. J. Somaiya Trust and Somaiya Vidyavihar.  SIMSR was granted the status of autonomous institute by the University Grants Commission in May 2013.

It offers programs including Post Graduate Diploma in Management, Master of Management Studies, Ph.D. pprograms in Management, and Management Development Programs. It is affiliated with the University of Mumbai and/or approved by AICTE. The institute is certified as ISO 9001:2008. It has received the SAQS Accreditation by AMDISA. It is a member of the Association to Advance Collegiate Schools of Business (AACSB).

References

External links

1981 establishments in Maharashtra
Business schools in Mumbai
Educational institutions established in 1981